The English Bowls Association was the governing body of bowls in England until 2007. From 2008 onwards, Bowls England was formed, which now runs the sport. The national finals for bowls are held annually, where either 1, 2 or 3 representatives from each county compete for the national titles.

Bowls England was inaugurated after two associations unified to form it, the English Bowling Association (EBA) and the English Women's Bowling Association (EWBA). The events are categorised into National Championships and National Competitions; below is the Mixed National Competitions.

Mixed national competitions

Mixed pairs champions

Mixed fours champions

See also
Men's National Championships
Women's National Championships
Men's National Competitions
Women's National Competitions

References

Bowls in England